Standing Room Only was a television programme on association football shown on British channel BBC2 in 1991.

Standing Room Only was produced by the BBC's Youth and Entertainment Features department, at the time headed up by Janet Street-Porter who was also executive producer. The first series consisted of six episodes broadcast in BBC2's "Def II" slot. The host was Simon O'Brien (who would later also co-present a series of Def II's "Rough Guide To The World" with Magenta Devine) but other people, including Shelley Webb, presented small sections of the programme. The format was magazine style mixing current news stories with star interviews and comedy. Notably involved were comedians David Baddiel and Rob Newman who delivered weekly sketches under the banner of "Sepp Maier's Comedy Shorts", Rory Bremner who recorded comedy voices, and Guardian cartoonist Steve Bell who drew a weekly graphic comic strip. The series was inspired by the growing mainstream interest in football and the popularity of so-called football fanzines magazines notably "When Saturday Comes" which offered the opinions of football fans themselves rather than professionals.  It had an informal style, with presenters usually standing near football grounds rather than sitting in a studio. In 1994, Baddiel would go on to co-host the hugely successful football series "Fantasy Football League" with fellow comedian Frank Skinner.

One feature was the Supporterloo (a pun on portaloo), a small trailer with little more than a camera and a seat shaped like a toilet, which was taken to different grounds around the UK.  Members of the public were invited to sit inside and give their views on their favourite team.  On one occasion the Blackburn Rovers reserve goalkeeper Bobby Mimms sat inside and expressed his frustration on not playing regularly for Rovers' first team.

Episodes 

This list is ordered by the original air dates on BBC2 in the United Kingdom.

References

External links
 
 British Film Institute

1991 British television series debuts
1994 British television series endings
BBC Television shows
English-language television shows
Association football television series